The following highways are numbered 699:

Canada

United States